Lhünzê County, (English: Lhöntse Dzong) is a county of Shannan located in the south-east of the Tibet Autonomous Region. Part of Lhünzê County is claimed by India as part of Arunachal Pradesh, which is a disputed area between People's Republic of China and India.

Geography
The Subansiri River, the largest tributary of the Brahmaputra, is formed in the county. A number of sub-tributaries such as Tsari Chu, Charme Chu, Nye Chu and Loro Chu, flow through the county, and join together in the adjoining Upper Subansiri district of Arunachal Pradesh in India.

Settlements
 Charme Dzong (Douyucun)
 Chayul Dzong (Jiayu)
 Migyutin (Zhari)
 Sangnag Chöling 
 Yümai (Yume)

Climate

Mining Controversy

In 2018, the Chinese government launched large-scale investments into mining precious metals like gold and silver from the region. This followed reports that rare earth minerals valued at over $60 billion had been found. Reports suggest that the gold rush has led to an unprecedented influx of people into the region. This is perceived as China's plan to claim the disputed border with India (Arunachal Pradesh) could turn the region into "another South China Sea".

References

Bibliography

External links
 Lhünzê County on OpenStreetMap
 Map of the Tsari pilgrimage by Claude Arpi

Counties of Tibet
Shannan, Tibet